The Serbia and Montenegro national handball team was a handball team that represented the state union of Serbia and Montenegro in the international matches and has been playing since the country's independence in the early 1990s. The team is controlled by the Serbia and Montenegro Handball Federation. It was succeeded by the Serbia national handball team and the Montenegro national handball team.

Competitions

Olympic Games

World Championship

European Championship

Head coaches
  Zoran Živković
  Jovica Elezović
  Zoran Živković
  Veselin Vujović (2000)
  Branislav Pokrajac (2000–2001)
  Zoran Živković (2001–2002)
  Zoran Kurteš (2002–2003)
  Veselin Vujović (2003–2006)
  Jovica Elezović (2006)

References

Former national handball teams
National sports teams of Serbia and Montenegro